John Michael Parks (born March 2, 1946) is a Canadian former politician. He served in the 33rd Legislative Assembly of British Columbia from 1983 to 1986, as a Social Credit member for the constituency of Maillardville-Coquitlam.

References

1946 births
British Columbia Social Credit Party MLAs
Living people
Politicians from Vancouver